The "Ride of the Valkyries" refers to the beginning of act 3 of Die Walküre, the second of the four operas constituting Richard Wagner's Der Ring des Nibelungen.

As a separate piece, the "Ride" is often heard in a purely instrumental version, which may be as short as three minutes. Together with the "Bridal Chorus" from Lohengrin, the "Ride of the Valkyries" is one of Wagner's best-known pieces.

Context 

The main theme of the "Ride", the leitmotif labelled , was first written down by the composer on 23 July 1851. The preliminary draft for the "Ride" was composed in 1854 as part of the composition of the entire opera, which was fully orchestrated by the end of March 1856.

In the Walküre opera, the "Ride", which takes around eight minutes, begins in the prelude to the third act, building up successive layers of accompaniment until the curtain rises to reveal a mountain peak where four of the eight Valkyrie sisters of Brünnhilde have gathered in preparation for the transportation of fallen heroes to Valhalla. As they are joined by the other four, the familiar tune is carried by the orchestra, while, above it, the Valkyries greet each other and sing their battle-cry. Apart from the song of the Rhinemaidens in Das Rheingold, it is the only ensemble piece in the first three operas of Wagner's Ring cycle.

Performance history 

The complete opera Die Walküre was first performed on 26 June 1870 in the National Theatre Munich against the composer's intent. By January of the next year, Wagner was receiving requests for the "Ride" to be performed separately, but wrote that such a performance should be considered "an utter indiscretion" and forbade "any such thing". However, the piece was still printed and sold in Leipzig, and Wagner wrote a complaint to the publisher Schott. In the period up to the first performance of the complete Ring cycle, Wagner continued to receive requests for separate performances, his second wife Cosima noting "Unsavoury letters arrive for R. – requests for the Ride of the Valkyries and I don't know what else." Once the Ring had been performed in Bayreuth in 1876, Wagner lifted the embargo. He himself conducted it in London on 12 May 1877, repeating it as an encore.

Outside opera 

Uses in film include the original score for The Birth of a Nation (1915), and What's Opera, Doc? (1957).

The "Ride" features in Apocalypse Now (1979), where the 1/9 Air Cavalry squadron plays it on helicopter-mounted loudspeakers during their assault on a Viet Cong-controlled village as psychological warfare and to motivate their own troops.

References

Notes

Sources

External links 

 
  (in MP3 format)
 Kirsten Flagstad, 1938

1856 compositions
Compositions by Richard Wagner
Compositions in B minor
Der Ring des Nibelungen
Opera excerpts